James Braid may refer to:

James Braid (golfer) (1870–1950), Scottish golfer
James Braid (politician) (1912–1999), Scottish nationalist politician
James Braid (surgeon) (1795–1860), Scottish surgeon and "gentleman scientist"

See also
James Braid Taylor (1891–1943), British banker